Sveinung Rotevatn (born 15 May 1987) is a Norwegian politician for the Liberal Party. Rotevatn comes from Nordfjordeid, Sogn og Fjordane, and has a master's degree in law from the University of Bergen. He served as Minister of Climate and the Environment from 2020 to 2021. Prior to that, he served as a state secretary at the same department from 2018 to 2020 under then minister Ola Elvestuen.

Career

Young Liberals
Rotevatn became the leader of the Young Liberals of Norway, the Liberal Party's youth wing, in 2010 and was succeeded in October 2013 by Tord Hustveit.

Other
In 2013, Bergens Tidende called him the biggest political talent in Norway.

Parliament
Rotevatn was elected an MP from the Sogn og Fjordane county constituency in the 2013 Norwegian parliamentary election. He failed to win re-election in the 2017 election, but was later appointed State Secretary to the Department of Justice and Public Security when the Liberal Party went into coalition government with the Conservative Party and the Progress Party on 17 January 2018.

He was re-elected to the Storting in the 2021 election, this time from Hordaland.

In January 2022, both he and his successor as environment minister, Espen Barth Eide, agreed that Norwegian politicians hadn't done enough to fight climate change. Rotevatn stated: "I take responsibility for every ton of CO2 we emitted and did not emit when I was Minister of Climate. I'm glad the emissions went down when the Liberal Party ruled, but it has not gone down fast enough".

Minister of Climate and the Environment
On 24 January 2020, following the Progress Party's withdrawal from government, he was appointed Minister of the Environment.

Party deputy leader
In May 2020, he announced his intention to run for the party leadership in September to succeed outgoing leader Trine Skei Grande. At the time, he became the first person to announce his run for leader following Grande's decision to resign.

On 23 August, he was designated deputy leader of the party, with Abid Raja as second deputy and Melby as party leader, unanimously by the party's election committee. 

At the party conference in September, he was elected first deputy leader, with Melby as leader and Raja as second deputy, unopposed.

References

1987 births
Living people
Liberal Party (Norway) politicians
21st-century Norwegian politicians
Ministers of Climate and the Environment of Norway